Henry Lyon may refer to:

Henry Lyon (politician) in Members of the California State Legislature
Hank Lyon, American politician in New Jersey
Henry Lyon, father of Emma, Lady Hamilton

See also
Harry Lyon (disambiguation)
Henry Lyons (disambiguation)